Sulphur Mountain may refer to:

 Sulphur Mountain (Alberta) in Banff National Park, Alberta, Canada
 Sulphur Mountain (Newton County, Arkansas) in Arkansas, USA 
 Sulphur Mountain (Pope County, Arizona) in Arizona, USA 
 Sulphur Mountain (California) in California, USA 
 Sulphur Mountain (Colorado) in Colorado, USA 
 Sulphur Mountain (Texas) in Texas, USA 
 Sulphur Mountain (Washington) in Washington, USA 
 Sulphur Mountain (Wyoming) in Wyoming, USA